The music of Papua New Guinea has a long history.

Traditional music

After independence, the outside world knew little of the diverse peoples' traditional music genres.  The first commercial release to see an international audience did not occur until 1991, when percussionist Mickey Hart's Voices of the Rainforest was released.

After 1872, foreigners introduced Christian hymns, including Gregorian chanting.  Peroveta anedia, ute and taibubu, all forms of Polynesian music, were also introduced in this period.  The Gold Rush brought an influx of Australian miners who brought with them the mouth organ.

Traditional celebrations, which include song, dance, feasting and gift-giving, are called sing-sing.  Vibrant and colorful costumes adorn the dancers, while a leader and a chorus sing a staggered approach to the same song, producing a fugue-like effect.  1993 saw television spreading across the country, and American popular music continued to affect Papuan music given the diffusion of radio since World War II.  Since 1953, singsings have become competitive in nature, with contests occurring in Port Moresby, Mt. Hagen and Goroka.  1949 saw the first Papuan to achieve international fame, Blasius To Una, begin his career.

By the end of the 1970s, a local recording industry had appeared and artists such as Sanguma and later George Telek began mixing native and Western styles like rock and jazz.

Sing-Sing photos and traditional instruments

Pop music

By the beginning of the 20th century, Christian hymns, work songs and gold rush songs were popular, some in native languages and some in English or German.  By the 1920s, recorded music had become popular and radio broadcasting of western popular music appeared by the late 1930s.  A few years later, Allied soldiers and sailors during World War II popularized the guitar and ukulele while stationed in the Philippines and Hawaii.  String bands became very popular by the early 1950s, and soon dominated the pop landscape.  In the late 1960s, rock bands like the Kopikats had appeared in cities, while string bands like the Paramana Strangers had become well known internationally.  This was followed by the importation of bamboo bands, a style of music from the Solomon Islands using bamboo tubes played by hitting them with sandals.  It first arrived in the area of Madang in the mid-1970s, and soon spread throughout the country.

Reggae music
Anslom Nakikus is a leading figure in Papua New Guinean reggae.

Hip hop/rap

O-Shen was one of the first to blend hip hop with reggae. The culture soon spread as many local underground talents surfaced, such as Naka Blood with their first hit "Pom Pom City" followed by "Time is Now". Another group surfaced later by the name of 3KiiNgZ, taking Papua New Guinea by storm with the hits "High Groove Theory", "Kanaka Walk", and "One Sound" (featuring Sprigga Mek from the hip hop collective Naka Blood.) Sprigga Mek of Naka Blood went solo and released "Sweet Mekeo", rapping in his local Mekeo dialect, and later released "Pasin Kanak;" this is now known as the unofficial national anthem of the Papua New Guinea Kanakas. Papua Gong Native with his Kanaka rhyming skills is one of the best-known local rappers rapping in Motu dialect.

Papua New Guinea musicians
Anslom Nakikus
O-Shen
Kande Dwayne
Maltech Citizen Boyz

References

Feld, Stephen. "Bamboo Boogie-Woogie". 2000. In: Broughton, Simon and Ellingham, Mark with McConnachie, James and Duane, Orla (Ed.), World Music, Vol. 2: Latin & North America, Caribbean, India, Asia and Pacific, pp 183–188. Rough Guides Ltd, Penguin Books.